Ab Barik-e Sofla or Ab Barik-e Pain (Persian: آب باریک پایین), both meaning "lower Ab Barik" may refer to:
 Ab Barik-e Sofla, Kermanshah
 Ab Barik-e Sofla, Aligudarz, Lorestan Province
 Ab Barik-e Sofla, Selseleh, Lorestan Province
 Ab Barik-e Sofla, Razavi Khorasan